The 2022 Gallagher Grand Prix was the thirteenth round of the 2022 IndyCar season. The race was held on July 30, 2022, in Speedway, Indiana at the Indianapolis Motor Speedway. The race consisted of 85 laps and was won by Alexander Rossi.

Entry list

Practice

Practice 1

Qualifying

Qualifying classification 

 Notes
 Bold text indicates fastest time set in session.

Warmup

Race 
The race started at 12:30 PM ET on July 30, 2022.

Race classification

Championship standings after the race 

Drivers' Championship standings

Engine manufacturer standings

 Note: Only the top five positions are included.

References

2022 in IndyCar
2022 in sports in Indiana
Gallagher Grand Prix